Glăvănești is a commune in Bacău County, Western Moldavia, Romania. It is composed of five villages: Frumușelu, Glăvănești, Muncelu, Putredeni and Răzeșu.

References

Communes in Bacău County
Localities in Western Moldavia